PaGaLGuY is a Mumbai, India-based educational services company.  The company hosts a social media site for students, and produces an educational app called Prepathon for online learning.



History

The website was founded in 2002 by an India's MBA student Allwin Agnel. Initially, the website was an easy to use education discussion forum.

In 2009, PaGaLGuY launched India's largest B-school rankings initiative. The project was a response to a growing need of both MBA aspirants and recruiters for a credible rating of B-schools.

On 12 December 2009, community members announced a protest against the government for a scam involving medical exams held in India. The students called the test unfair, inconsistent and chaotic, and alleged that the questions were leaked even as the examination was underway.

In 2010, PaGaLGuY created and launched an MBA affiliate program, allowing students to register on the website and apply to multiple colleges thorough a single platform. An applicant's status can be tracked, and he or she can correspond with institutes and pay application fees via the portal.

In July 2012, the website was relaunched incorporating social networking features to its platform, changing from a forum website to a social network.

In January 2016, the company launched an interactive test preparation learning application called Prepathon.  The application raised undisclosed Series A funding in May, and in July received media coverage for its use of automated bots.

In July 2018, PaGaLGuY was covered as one of the top 11 brand by CNBC as a part of its book Booming Brands – The Inspiring Story of 11 'Made in India' Brands

References

External links
 

Education companies of India
2002 establishments in Maharashtra
Companies based in Mumbai
Indian companies established in 2002